The following lists events that happened during 2011 in South Sudan.

Incumbents 
 President: Salva Kiir Mayardit (starting 9 July)
 Vice President: Riek Machar (starting 9 July)

Events

January
 January 4 - Sudanese President Omar al-Bashir goes to Juba to meet with Southern Sudanese President of the Government Salva Kiir Mayardit ahead of Southern Sudan's independence referendum.
 January 7 - The United Nations says thousands of people are arriving in Southern Sudan from north Sudan ahead of the independence referendum on Sunday.
 January 8 - Several people are killed in clashes with security forces in Southern Sudan, a day before the independence referendum.
 January 10 - 36 people killed, including possibly 20 police, as Southern Sudan votes on referendum on independence.
 January 12 - The Sudan People's Liberation Army/Movement estimates that turnout in the Southern Sudanese independence referendum has passed the 60% threshold for the result to be declared valid.
 January 13 - The Southern Sudanese independence referendum, 2011 is confirmed by organisers to have had a turnout above the necessary threshold needed for it to be valid.
 January 15 - The Southern Sudanese independence referendum, 2011 ends.
 January 16 - Southern Sudanese leader Salva Kiir calls on the people of South Sudan to forgive the north for killings during the civil war.
 January 21 - Almost 99% of South Sudanese voted for independence from the north in a referendum according to official figures.
 January 26 - The preliminary results of the referendum on an independence for Southern Sudan will be announced in the next few days, with final results as early as February 7; most of the count in the south already completed shows 99% voted for independence.
 January 30 - Southern Sudan chooses to become independent of Sudan with over 99% voting yes in the referendum.
 January 31 - Southern Sudan announces it plans to officially declare independence from Sudan on July 9, 2011.

February
 February 2 - The Sudanese government, in its first official reaction after preliminary results were announced indicating a landslide vote in favor of Southern Sudan's independence, agrees to accept the results; Vice-President Ali Osman Taha says the government intends "to pursue a policy of good neighbourly relations with the south".
 February 5 - At least 20 people are killed in a shootout among the military in Malakal.

March

April

May

June

July

July 9 - South Sudan became an independent republic.

July - the Sudanese pound is replaced by the South Sudanese pound, which is released in the form of banknotes for £1 SSP, £5 SSP, £10 SSP, £25 SSP, £50 SSP, and £100 SSP.

August

September

October

November

December

 
South Sudan
Years of the 21st century in South Sudan
2010s in South Sudan
South Sudan